The Aurum Film Encyclopedia, Volume 2: Science Fiction is a book by Phil Hardy published in 1984.

Plot summary
The Aurum Film Encyclopedia, Volume 2: Science Fiction is a book that covers more than 1200 science fiction films, from one-minute films from the 1890s to the releases of 1983. Expanded editions were published on 1991 and 1995, and were published by The Overlook Press in the United States with the corresponding change in title.

Reception
Dave Langford reviewed The Aurum Film Encyclopedia, Volume 2: Science Fiction for White Dwarf #60, and stated that "it's top class, for both browsing and reference."

Colin Greenland reviewed The Aurum Film Encyclopedia: Science Fiction for Imagine magazine, and stated that "Anyone who cares about SF films should badger librarians or gift-givers for a copy of The Aurum Film Encyclopedia: Science Fiction."

References

1984 books
Aurum Press books
Science fiction books
The Overlook Press books